Iulius Mall Suceava is a shopping mall in Suceava, Romania.
It was opened on 15 November 2008. The building was designed by Valentin Ilie and Calin Caliman of Rocada Architects.

The mall has:

 170 stores
 Auchan hypermarket
 Bricostore
 Cinema City ten-screen movie theater complex 
 24 fast food and other restaurants 
 Fitness club
 Games including bowling and billiards
 Kidsland
 1,300 parking spaces
 Walk-in COVID-19 vaccination centre

The mall has a colourful  chimney. It is planned to transform it into an observation tower.

Gallery

See also

 Iulius Mall Cluj
 Palas Iași
 Iulius Mall Iaşi
 Iulius Town Timișoara

References

External links
 Iulius Mall Suceava Official Site

Shopping malls in Suceava